Daniel Angelo Roque (born November 1990), also known as Chino Roque, was one of the 23 space cadets selected from more than 28,000 Filipino candidates by the Axe Apollo Space Academy in 2013 to fly to space with XCOR Lynx. Being the only Filipino who qualified in the international astronaut selection, he would be considered as the first Filipino Astronaut when the Sub-Orbital spaceflight takes place.

Early life and career
Roque finished elementary and secondary education at De La Salle Santiago Zobel School, and obtained a bachelor's degree in psychology at De La Salle University in 2013. He captained the men’s futbol team from 2010-2012. After graduation, he gained experience as an Student Pilot and obtained a Commercial Pilot’s license at the Omni Aviation Corporation in Clark Freeport and Special Economic Zone, Pampanga, he owns and works as a CrossFit Trainer in Central Ground CrossFit, BGC, Taguig.

Selection as astronaut
In 2013, after weeks of physical challenges and aptitude tests conducted by the Axe Apollo Space Academy at the Kennedy Space Center, Roque emerged as the representative of the Philippines. Roque also aced a series of scuba and obstacle course training- at the Axe Apollo Space Academy in Florida. Roque endured the zero gravity aircraft, the centrifuge, and was granted a co-pilot experience in a fighter Jet where he states he was able to barrel roll and snap roll with a Marchetti.

Buzz Aldrin, one of the American astronauts who conducted the first Moon landing in 1969, served as the selection committee chairman of the said program. Roque revealed that he would bring three items in the planned space flight. These are: the Filipino flag, a rosary, and a photograph.  

While the proposed sub-orbital spaceflight was scheduled to be completed sometime between 2014 and 2015, no flight has been conducted with the proposed XCOR Lynx to date. This has been connected with the declared bankruptcy of XCOR Aerospace in 2017, the company sponsoring the vehicle to be used by the Axe Apollo Space Academy.

References

1991 births
De La Salle University alumni
Living people
Astronaut candidates